Carmel Convent (Primary and High) School is an all-girl Catholic institution located in Kolkata, India. 

The school is a Christian school established and administered by the Apostolic Carmel Education Society of West Bengal in the Roman Catholic Church. The school is under the religious jurisdiction of the Roman Catholic Bishop in Kolkata.

It is an English medium school, with Bengali and Hindi is also taught. Extracurricular activities offered include singing, dancing, crafts, and karate. The school provides yearly donations in the form of food, medicines and clothing via Ashadeep Trust.

The foundress of Carmel School is Mother Veronica.

History
On 1 April 1956, Carmel School, then known as St. Mary's Carmel School, was started at 19, Deshapriya Park Road, Kolkata. It began as a primary school consisting of the Upper and Lower Kindergarten and Classes I-IV, with English and Bengali as the medium of instruction. The need for more classrooms necessitated expansion and classes V upwards were shifted to 41, Gariahat Road South. In 1969, the school was recognised as a higher secondary school with two streams: Humanities and Science. It is now known as Carmel High School. In 1970, the first batch of Higher Secondary students was sent up.

In January 1975, the reorganised scheme of studies introduced by the West Bengal Board of Secondary Education was adopted and a new curriculum was implemented. In 1996, Carmel High School was upgraded to Carmel Higher Secondary School with three streams: Science, Commerce and Arts.

Campuses
The school has two campuses:
 The primary section (Carmel Primary School, or CPS) is at 19, Deshapriya Park Road South, Kolkata.
 The higher section (Carmel High School, or CHS) is at 41, Gariahat Road South, Kolkata.

Classes between l-kindergarten and class IV are conducted in the Junior Section but with different timings, while classes between V and XII are conducted at the High School campus.

References 

Carmelite educational institutions
Catholic schools in India
Christian schools in West Bengal
Primary schools in West Bengal
High schools and secondary schools in Kolkata
Girls' schools in Kolkata
Educational institutions established in 1956
1956 establishments in West Bengal